Mohammad Savari (born 13 February 1985) is an Iranian football goalkeeper who currently plays for Sepahan F.C. in the Iran Pro League. he was linked to play for Esteghlal Ahvaz in 2008–2009 on loan, but he was not moved to the club. instead, he went on loan to its rival club Foulad.

Club career

Club career statistics

1 includes 2 matches in FIFA Club World Cup 2007.

Honours

Club
Iran's Premier Football League
 Winner: 2
 2009/10 with Sepahan
 2010/11 with Sepahan
 Runner up: 1
 2007/08 with Sepahan
Hazfi Cup
 Winner: 1
 2006/07 with Sepahan
Asian Champions League
 Runner up: 1
 2007 with Sepahan

References

1985 births
Living people
Iranian footballers
Association football goalkeepers
Sepahan S.C. footballers
Sepahan Novin players